Gordon R. Glennan (September 28, 1903 – January 7, 1995) was an American sound engineer. He was nominated for an Academy Award in the category Best Sound Recording for the film Friendly Persuasion.

Selected filmography
 Friendly Persuasion (1956)

References

External links

1903 births
1995 deaths
American audio engineers